The Agan is a river in Khanty-Mansi Autonomous Okrug in Russia.

Course
The Agan is a left tributary of the Tromyogan, of the Ob basin. To the south of its course lies the basin of the Vatinsky Yogan.

See also
List of rivers of Russia

References

Rivers of Khanty-Mansi Autonomous Okrug